Means House may refer to:

Orna Villa, known also as Alexander Means House, Oxford, Georgia, NRHP-listed
Emily Means House, South Bristol, Maine, NRHP-listed  
Means House (Jonesville, South Carolina), NRHP-listed  
V. R. Means House, Belton, Texas, NRHP-listed  
Means-Justiss House, Paris, Texas, NRHP-listed

See also
Means Street Historic District, Atlanta, Georgia, NRHP-listed